Kittitas County is a county located in the U.S. state of Washington. At the 2020 census, its population was 44,337. Its county seat and largest city is Ellensburg. The county was created in November 1883 when it was carved out of Yakima County. Kittitas County comprises the Ellensburg, Washington, Micropolitan Statistical Area.

There are numerous interpretations of the county's name, which is from the language of the Yakama Nation. According to one source, it "has been said to mean everything from 'white chalk' to 'shale rock' to 'shoal people' to 'land of plenty'". Most anthropologists and historians concede that each interpretation has some validity depending upon the particular dialect spoken.

History
The county was organized in November 1883 by the Washington Territorial Legislature, carved from the northern part of Yakima County.

Indigenous peoples known as Kittitas (or Upper Yakima) occupied the lands along the Yakima River for hundreds of years before the present era. The Kittitas Valley was a traditional gathering place for tribes east of the Cascades.

White settlers began pouring into the Kittitas Valley in the late 1850s. Their arrival forced dislocation and displacement of the native inhabitants, who were eventually forced into the Yakama Indian Reservation. White settlers introduced livestock raising, crop farming, dairying, logging, lumber processing, and mining. The abundant grassland and the generally-favorable terrain made beef and cattle production become the county's mainstay. That was assisted by the introduction of railways into the area and the large-scale irrigation systems introduced in the 1930s.

Wheat planting in Kittitas Valley began in 1868. The county's first flour mill was established near Ellensburg in 1873. Production of alfalfa was also seen from the county's early days.

Lumber extraction was an important county activity from its early days, mostly in the west end. Logging camps were established near the county's three largest lakes (Cle Elum, Kachess, Keechelus).

Mining for coal and minerals was established by the mid-1880s.

Geography

Geographic features
Cascade Mountains
Yakima River
Manastash Ridge
Wenatchee Mountains

Major highways
 Interstate 90
 Interstate 82
 U.S. Route 97

Adjacent counties
Chelan County - north
Douglas County - northeast
Grant County - east
Yakima County - south
Pierce County - west
King County - northwest

National protected areas
Snoqualmie National Forest (part)
Wenatchee National Forest (part)

Demographics

2000 census
As of the census of 2000, there were 33,362 people, 13,382 households, and 7,788 families living in the county. The population density was 14 people per square mile (6/km2). There were 16,475 housing units at an average density of 7 per square mile (3/km2). The racial makeup of the county was 91.77% White, 0.71% Black or African American, 0.91% Native American, 2.19% Asian, 0.15% Pacific Islander, 2.30% from other races, and 1.97% from two or more races. 5.00% of the population were Hispanic or Latino of any race. 19.4% were of German, 11.7% English, 9.0% Irish, 7.8% United States or American, 6.6% Norwegian, 3.8% Italian, 3.2% Swedish, 3.1% French, 3.0% Dutch, 1.7% Polish, and 1.3% Danish ancestry. 93.2% spoke English and 4.5% Spanish as their first language.

There were 13,382 households, out of which 26.20% had children under the age of 18 living with them, 47.80% were married couples living together, 7.20% had a female householder with no husband present, and 41.80% were non-families. 28.40% of all households were made up of individuals, and 8.60% had someone living alone who was 65 years of age or older.  The average household size was 2.33 and the average family size was 2.90.

In the county, the population was spread out, with 20.60% under the age of 18, 21.60% from 18 to 24, 24.60% from 25 to 44, 21.60% from 45 to 64, and 11.60% who were 65 years of age or older. The median age was 31 years. For every 100 females there were 98.70 males. For every 100 females age 18 and over, there were 97.20 males.

The median income for a household in the county was $32,546, and the median income for a family was $46,057. Males had a median income of $36,257 versus $25,640 for females. The per capita income for the county was $18,928.  About 10.50% of families and 19.60% of the population were below the poverty line, including 15.60% of those under age 18 and 8.20% of those age 65 or over.

2010 census
As of the 2010 census, there were 40,915 people, 16,595 households, and 9,225 families living in the county. The racial makeup of the county was 89.3% white, 2.0% Asian, 1.0% American Indian, 0.9% black or African American, 0.1% Pacific islander, 3.7% from other races, and 3.0% from two or more races. Those of Hispanic or Latino origin made up 7.6% of the population. In terms of ancestry, 26.2% were German, 15.4% were Irish, 12.7% were English, 8.2% were Norwegian, 5.1% were Italian, 5.0% were Swedish, and 3.4% were American.

Of the 16,595 households, 24.1% had children under the age of 18 living with them, 44.7% were married couples living together, 7.3% had a female householder with no husband present, 44.4% were non-families, and 28.7% of all households were made up of individuals. The average household size was 2.32 and the average family size was 2.87. The median age was 31.9 years.

The median income for a household in the county was $41,232 and the median income for a family was $61,276. Males had a median income of $45,916 versus $35,380 for females. The per capita income for the county was $23,467. About 10.3% of families and 21.2% of the population were below the poverty line, including 19.8% of those under age 18 and 7.0% of those age 65 or over.

Government and politics

Kittitas County is directed by a three-member Board of Commissioners.

The current County Commissioners are:
 District 1: Cory Wright (term: January 1, 2021 to December 31, 2024)
 District 2: Laura Osiadacz (term: January 1, 2021 to December 31, 2024)
 District 3: Brett Wachsmith (term: January 1, 2019 - December 31, 2022)

In presidential elections, it is a conservative county which has voted in the majority for the Republican candidate since the beginning of the 21st century.

Flora and fauna
There are a variety of species represented within Kittitas County. These include a diversity of grasses, herbs, trees, birds, mammals and amphibians. The genus of ricegrass known as Oryzopsis was one of the earliest grasses classified within the county. Among the amphibian species found are the Cascades frog and the rough-skinned newt, the latter being a common far western USA taxon; in fact, examples of neoteny have been found in individual newts of this species within the county.

Communities

Cities
Cle Elum
Ellensburg (county seat)
Kittitas
Roslyn

Town 
South Cle Elum

Census-designated places
 Easton
 Ronald
 Snoqualmie Pass (including Hyak)
 Thorp
 Vantage

Unincorporated communities
Doris
Liberty
Rocklyn
Suncadia
Teanaway
Thrall

Events
The Kittitas County Fair and Ellensburg Rodeo occur every Labor Day Weekend. The Kittitas County Fair began in 1885, and moved to its current location (North Maple and East 8th Avenue in Ellensburg) in 1923.

See also
National Register of Historic Places listings in Kittitas County, Washington

References

Further reading
 William Denison Lyman, History of the Yakima Valley, Washington: Comprising Yakima, Kittitas, and Benton Counties. In Two Volumes. Chicago: S.J. Clarke Publishing Co., 1919. Volume 1 | Volume 2
Andrew Caveness, "Images of America: Kittitas County." South Carolina: Arcadia Publishing Co., 2012.

External links

 Kittitas County Chamber of Commerce
 Kittitas County official website
 Thorp Mill Town Historical Preservation Society
 The CWU Brooks Library Frederick Krueger Photograph Collection The Frederick Krueger Collection contains images of the Upper Kittitas Valley of Washington State from the 1880s to the 1960s. The images, scanned from photographic prints, glass negatives and rare publications, visually document the communities of Cle Elum, Roslyn and other towns and villages in western Kittitas County.  The collection also focuses upon mining, logging and fur trapping in the region during the late 19th century and early 20th century.

 
1883 establishments in Washington Territory
Populated places established in 1883
Eastern Washington
Washington placenames of Native American origin